Soumi Chatterjee is a Spanish translator from Kolkata, India. Her most famous work till date has been translating El Equilibrista (2009) into English as The Tightrope (2012), released in Indian Council For Cultural Relations in Kolkata on behalf of the Embassy of Paraguay in New Delhi, India, for which she received critical appraisal.

Early life
Ms. Chatterjee lived in Port Blair for thirteen years before settling in Kolkata, India. She completed her higher studies from Carmel Senior Secondary School. She completed her graduation and post graduation courses from Garden City College, under Bengaluru University. The domain of her graduation studies extended into the frontiers of Chemistry, Genetics and Microbiology, while that of her post graduation courses was about Biochemistry. Later, she completed her M.Phil studies specializing in Cognitive Neuroscience from Jadavpur University, where she was the top scorer of her batch. The topic of her thesis was an EEG study based on the cognitive functioning in the Frontal lobe of Human Brain when subjected to an Optical illusion.

Personal life 
Her father, Shri. Tapan Kumar Chatterjee was a retired Merchant Navy officer- and her younger sibling, Sanjay Chatterjee, is also currently working as a Merchant Navy Officer. Mrs. Pratima Chatterjee, her mother, is a retired government service employee under the Ministry of Forest and Environment - Port Blair, India.

Professional life 
She began her career as a content writer of a Scientific Journal, working with a start up company. Later she moved on to follow her dreams in the field on medical sciences and started working as an Embryologist in Bhagirathi Neotia Woman & Child Care Center, Kolkata. That same year, she lost her father. She then decided to quit her job and continue higher education. After completing her degree for M.Phil. in Cognitive Science from Jadavpur University she got absorbed into the same university as a Junior Research Fellow and worked there for 10 months before taking a sabbatical. Post that period, she switched her professional path and started working toward a career as a Spanish language expert. She was the sole Spanish language interpreter for Vodafone Shared Services in India for three years, where she also won the award for category Best Trainer in Foreign Language. Here, she also worked as a project manager. Currently she lives and works in Pune, Maharashta, in the field of Project Management.

Publications 
Her works of translation include:

 El Equilibrista by Susana Gertopan: co translated by Soumi Chatterjee and released under the name 'The Tightrope' - in collaboration with Embassy of Paraguay in New Delhi, India, in the year 2012.
 Tales of Costa Rica - A collection of short folk tales from Costa Rica, a project done in collaboration with Embassy of Costa Rica, New Delhi, India, in the year 2013.

She also writes several short stories, prose and poetry in various blogging platforms.

References

Spanish translators
Year of birth missing (living people)
Living people
Indian women translators